Pain Darreh (also Romanized as Pā’īn Darreh) is a village in Mokriyan-e Gharbi Rural District, in the Central District of Mahabad County, West Azerbaijan Province, Iran. At the 2006 census, its population was 504, in 69 families.

References 

Populated places in Mahabad County